Quarantine Island may refer to:

 Quarantine Island / Kamau Taurua near Dunedin, New Zealand
 Rainsford Island near Boston, Massachusetts in the United States
 Sand Island (Hawaii)
 Karantina Island, near İzmir, Turkey